Colorado wine refers to wine made from grapes grown in the U.S. state of Colorado. Most of Colorado's vineyards are located on the western slope of the Rocky Mountains, though an increasing number of wineries are located along the Front Range.

Geography and climate
The mountain climate ensures warm summer days and cool nights. Colorado is home to two designated American Viticultural Areas of the Grand Valley AVA and the West Elks AVA, where most of the vineyards in the state are located. Other wine regions include: the Four Corners area near Cortez, near Canyons of the Ancients National Monument, and Durango; Pikes Peak/Arkansas River Valley near Salida, Cañon City, and Manitou Springs; and the Front Range between Fort Collins and Castle Rock, with many wineries located in the Denver metropolitan area.

History
Grapevines were first brought to Colorado in the 19th century by miners in southern Colorado. The first agricultural record of vineyards was when Governor George A. Crawford, founder of Grand Junction planted 60 acres of grapes and other fruit near Palisade. Homegrown wine was once a part of life in Colorado as it was throughout America. Like in other areas Prohibition in the United States virtually wiped out the Colorado wine industry in the early twentieth century only to have it resurrected again in the 1960s. In 1968, Gerald Ivancie opened Ivancie Winery in Denver using grapes from California, but was instrumental in developing experimental plantings of premium wine grapes in and around the Grand Valley. Ivancie's winemaker was Warren Winiarski, who was the first winemaker at Robert Mondavi Winery and rose to fame when he won the Judgement of Paris (wine) tasting in 1976 for his Stag's Leap Wine Cellars S.L.V Cabernet Sauvignon.

Colorado's Limited Farm Winery Act was passed in 1977. A decade later, Colorado was one of the first states to respond to California's offer to establish free trade among wineries and consumers through the Reciprocal Shipping Law, helping the re-emerging Colorado grape growing and winemaking industry.

In 1990, with five operating wineries, the Colorado General Assembly created the Colorado Wine Industry Development Board (CWIDB). In 1991, the Grand Valley area near Palisade, Colorado, was recognized by the federal government as an American Viticultural Area (AVA). In 2001, the West Elks AVA was added as the second AVA. In 2010, there were approximately 115 commercial wineries in Colorado. In 2019, there are approximately 165 wineries - including 21 hard cider producers, 13 mead producers and 1 sake producer.

In 2021, Warren Winiarski invested in the Colorado wine and grape industry through a $150,000 grant from the Winiarski Family Foundation, the charitable foundation established by Winiarski and his wife, Barbara. The grant benefits the Western Colorado Community College Viticulture and Enology program.

Governor's Cup Competition

Every year, the Colorado Wine Industry Development Board hosts the Governor's Cup Competition; which is the only competition exclusively for Colorado wineries. Each year, the CWIDB invites licensed Colorado wineries to submit samples for evaluation by a panel of esteemed wine professionals from around the United States. The top wines from the competition comprise the Governor's Cup Collection which is used to showcase the industry to the public and the wine industry. The winners are honored at public event called Colorado UnCorked and the Best of Show is announced at the event.

Governor's Cup Best of Show winners:

2014 - Canyon Wind Cellars 2012 Petit Verdot

2015 - Canyon Wind Cellars 2013 "Anemoi Lips" Syrah AND Turquoise Mesa Winery 2013 Syrah

2016 - BookCliff Vineyards 2013 "Ensemble" Red Blend

2017 - Creekside Cellars 2014 Cabernet Franc

2018 - BookCliff Vineyards 2015 Cabernet Franc Reserve

2019 - Qutori Wines 2017 Syrah

2020 - No Competition

2021 - Announced on Nov. 5, 2021

Grapes
The most popular grapes grown in Colorado are varieties in the species of European grape Vitis vinifera. The most popular red varieties are Merlot, Cabernet Sauvignon, Syrah, and Cabernet Franc. The most popular white varieties are Chardonnay, Riesling, and Viognier.

Recognition
Several Colorado wineries have been awarded scores of 90 points or above by Wine Enthusiast Magazine and The Wine Advocate.

In 2017, Colorado Mountain Winefest was voted the best wine festival in the U.S. by USA Today's "10Best".

Also in 2017, Kyle Schlachter (Outreach Coordinator for the CO Wine Industry Development Board) was named one of Wine Enthusiast Magazine's 40 Under 40 Tastemakers because his efforts reflect the diversity and uniqueness of wine in the U.S.

In 2018, Wine Enthusiast Magazine named Colorado's Grand Valley AVA one of the Top Ten wine travel destinations in the world.

See also
 American wine
 Grand Valley AVA
 West Elks AVA

References

External links
 Colorado Wine
  TTB AVA Map

 
Wine regions of the United States by state